Daur or Dahur may refer to:
Daur people, a sub-ethnic group mostly living in Inner Mongolia, China
Daur language, a Mongolic language primarily spoken by the Daur people
Dawar (Pashtun tribe), a Pashtun tribe in North Waziristan, Pakistan
Daughter, sometimes abbreviated "Daur." in older census data

Places
Daur, Pakistan, a town in the Pakistani province of Sindh
Khentei-Daur Highlands, Far Eastern Russia
Dahur, Iran, a village in South Khorasan Province, Iran
Ad-Dawr, a town in Saladin Governorate, Iraq
Al-Daur District, Saladin Governorate, Iraq

People with the given name
Daur Zantaria (1953–2001), Abkhaz writer and journalist
Daur Tarba (born 1959), Minister for Agriculture of Abkhazia
Daur Arshba (born 1962), head of the Presidential Administration of Abkhazia
Daur Akhvlediani (1964–1993), Abkhaz footballer
Daur Kobakhia (born 1970), Chairman of the State Committee for Customs of Abkhazia
Daur Kurmazia (born 1974), Minister for Taxes and Fees of Abkhazia
Daur Kvekveskiri (born 1998), Russian footballer

People with the surname
Caroline Daur (born 1995), German fashion blogger

Language and nationality disambiguation pages